The echinoderm and flatworm mitochondrial code (translation table 9) is a genetic code used by the mitochondria of certain echinoderm and flatworm species.

The code

   AAs  = FFLLSSSSYY**CCWWLLLLPPPPHHQQRRRRIIIMTTTTNNNKSSSSVVVVAAAADDEEGGGG
Starts = -----------------------------------M---------------M------------
 Base1 = TTTTTTTTTTTTTTTTCCCCCCCCCCCCCCCCAAAAAAAAAAAAAAAAGGGGGGGGGGGGGGGG
 Base2 = TTTTCCCCAAAAGGGGTTTTCCCCAAAAGGGGTTTTCCCCAAAAGGGGTTTTCCCCAAAAGGGG
 Base3 = TCAGTCAGTCAGTCAGTCAGTCAGTCAGTCAGTCAGTCAGTCAGTCAGTCAGTCAGTCAGTCAG

Bases: adenine (A), cytosine (C), guanine (G) and thymine (T) or uracil (U).

Amino acids: Alanine (Ala, A), Arginine (Arg, R), Asparagine (Asn, N), Aspartic acid (Asp, D), Cysteine (Cys, C), Glutamic acid (Glu, E), Glutamine (Gln, Q), Glycine (Gly, G), Histidine (His, H), Isoleucine (Ile, I), Leucine (Leu, L), Lysine (Lys, K), Methionine (Met, M), Phenylalanine (Phe, F), Proline (Pro, P), Serine (Ser, S), Threonine (Thr, T), Tryptophan (Trp, W), Tyrosine (Tyr, Y), Valine (Val, V)

Differences from the standard code

Systematic range
 Asterozoa (starfishes) 
 Echinozoa (sea urchins) 
 Rhabditophora among the Platyhelminthes

See also 
 List of genetic codes

References

Molecular genetics
Gene expression
Protein biosynthesis